Placido Betancourt was a Honduran rancher and politician. He served as the mayor of Olanchito in 1899.

References

Mayors of places in Honduras
Year of birth missing
Year of death missing